Chlumetia transversa, the mango shoot borer, is a moth of the family Euteliidae. The species was first described by Francis Walker in 1863. It is a widely distributed across Indo-Australian tropical countries far east to Solomon Islands.

Distribution
It is well distributed in Indo-Australian tropical countries of India, Pakistan, Sri Lanka, Bangladesh towards China, Korea, and Indonesia, Malaysia, Thailand, Andaman Islands , Nicobar Islands and Solomon Islands.

Description
Adult wingspan is 1.5 cm. Forewings shining gray, whereas hindwings light gray. Submarginal band of forewing is broken. Reniform open anteriorly. Dark grayish subbasal shading visible. Valves of male genitalia slender and curved upwards. Short uncus is broad and polygonal. Caterpillar has dull violaceous dorsum and greenish ventrum. Head brownish, which becomes testaceous in late instars. Spiracles narrow. Legs and prolegs short. Final instar is dark pink.

Pest attack
The caterpillar is a serious pest of Mangifera indica. It eats young leaves and then bores into the midrib and terminal shoots. Heavy infestation results in leaf abscission and wilting of shoots. Other larval host plants include Litchi chinensis, Buchanania, Mangifera foetida and Solanum erianthum.

Control
Pests can be controlled by light traps, pheromone traps, hand picking, pruning, or application of several pesticides such as carbaryl, quinalphos, monocrotophos, fenvalerate or cypermethrin.

Larvae of the parasitoid Megaselia chlumetiae is known to parasitize shoot borer caterpillars by laying eggs on the integument of the caterpillar. Emerged fly larvae then enter the caterpillar and feed on its internal tissues. Finally the pupation occurs within the dead caterpillar.

Gallery

References

External links
Occurrence of the mango shoot borer, Chlumetia transversa Walker (Lepidoptera: Noctuidae) in the agricultural university area, Mymensingh, Bangladesh
Studies on incidence and control of Chlumetia transversa Walker (Lepidoptera: Noctuidae) on mango
Chlumetia transversa Walker Mango shoot borer
  
Life habits of Chlumetia transversa and its control
Identification and expression profiling of pheromone biosynthesis activating neuropeptide in Chlumetia transversa
Diversity and nature of damage of mango insect pests in south Gujarat ecosystem

Moths of Asia
Moths described in 1863
Euteliinae